Vice Admiral Robert Charles Parker (born September 7, 1957) is a retired officer of the United States Coast Guard.

Coast Guard career 

Vice Admiral Robert C. Parker assumed the duties as Commander, Coast Guard Atlantic Area in April 2010, where he serves as the operational commander for all U.S. Coast Guard missions from the Rocky Mountains to the Persian Gulf, spanning across five Coast Guard Districts and 40 states.  He concurrently serves as Commander, Defense Force East and provides Coast Guard mission support to the Department of Defense and Combatant Commanders. Before assuming command of LANTAREA, Vice Admiral Parker served as the U.S. Southern Command’s first Director of Security and Intelligence in Miami, Florida.  He was promoted to Flag rank in July 2006 and was assigned as the Assistant Commandant for Capabilities in Washington, DC.

Vice Admiral Parker has over 12 years of sea duty, including three commands. His assignments ashore have included: Operations Center Duty Officer for the Twelfth Coast Guard District and Pacific Area in Alameda, California; Security Assistance Liaison Officer in Monrovia, Liberia; Professional Development Branch Chief at the U. S. Coast Guard Academy, New London, Connecticut; Chief, Pacific Area Operational Forces Branch in Alameda; Chief of Operations, Eleventh Coast Guard District in Alameda; and Chief of Staff, Thirteenth Coast Guard District in Seattle, Washington.

Education 

Robert Parker is a 1979 graduate of the U. S. Coast Guard Academy.  Additionally, he holds a Master of Arts degree in National Security and Strategic Studies from the U. S. Naval War College.  He also completed a one-year National Security Fellowship at the John F. Kennedy School of Government at Harvard University in 1999.

Retirement
On Friday, May 16, 2014, VADM Parker was relieved as Commander, Coast Guard Atlantic Area by VADM William "Dean" Lee at a change of command and retirement ceremony held at Naval Station Norfolk, Virginia. VADM Parker subsequently retired from active duty.

Awards and decorations

References

External links 

1957 births
Living people
United States Coast Guard Academy alumni
Naval War College alumni
United States Coast Guard admirals